Music from the 3D Concert Experience is a live album release by the American trio, Jonas Brothers. It was released on February 24, 2009, three days before their concert film's release. The soundtrack was expected to debut at the top of the charts but debuted at #3 on the Billboard 200. It is their second soundtrack. As of February 2015, it has sold 189,000 copies in the United States.

Track listing

Notes: I'm Gonna Getcha Good is not featured in the film.

Critical reception

Allmusic's review was positive, earning 3 out of 5 they appeared in  Miley Cyrus' concert film Best of Both Worlds Concert.

Charts

Weekly charts

Year-end charts

Certifications

Chart performance
The album debut at #3 and stayed for 10 consecutive weeks and another 4 unconsecutive weeks.

References

Jonas Brothers albums
2009 soundtrack albums
Concert film soundtracks
Hollywood Records soundtracks